At , the Großer Farmdenkopf is the highest peak in the Thuringian Highland. It is situated in the county of Sonneberg in the German state of Thuringia.

Location 
The Großer Farmdenkopf is the highest point of the Wurzelberg massif in the northwest of the county of Sonneberg southeast of Goldisthal, which lies in the deeply incised Schwarza valley, and northwest of nearby Scheibe-Alsbach, which is a little further away and sprawls out above the river in the same valley. The whole of the massif lies north of the Rennsteig and thus in the Northern High Slate Mountains (Nördlichen Hohen Schiefergebirge).

Isolation and prominence 
With a topographic isolation of over 20 kilometres, the Großer Farmdenkopf is one of the most dominant mountains in  Thuringia. Only the Großer Finsterberg (944 m), 21.3 km away, the Großer Eisenberg (907 m) and Neuhäuser Hügel (892 m), 21.8 km away to the northwest, are higher.

In order to reach the Finsterberg, one must descend to a height of at least about 698 metres, which gives a topographic prominence of 171 metres. The col is immediately next to the Schwalbenhaupt in the extreme northeast of the highland near its boundary with the Central Thuringian Forest, at the crossroads of the Landesstraße from Masserberg to Neustadt, near the Rennsteig, and the one crossing the ridge and running from Gießübel to Oelze.

Goldisthal Pumped Storage Station 

The appearance of the Großer Farmdenkopf from a distance is mainly characterised by the upper basin of the Goldisthal Pumped Storage Station, built on the top of the mountain. Only the tips of the trees on the summit are higher than the dykes of the basin.

Hiking and viewing points 
From the Großer Farmdenkopf there is a unique all-round view of the Thurigian Highland and Thuringian Forest. The numerous viewing points may be visited on a 360 degree circular walk around the upper basin of the Goldisthal Pumped Storage Station; a full circuit requires the negotiation of several hundred metres along a very narrow ridge.

Amongst the other mountains visible from the summit are the Großer Gleichberg (679 m, ein Inselberg), Adlersberg (849.9 m), Großer Eisenberg (907 m), Großer Finsterberg (944 m), Schneekopf (978 m), Großer Beerberg (983 m), Kickelhahn (861 m), Kieferle (868 m), Dürre Fichte (861 m), Bleßberg (867 m, with its transmission site and viewing tower) and Eselsberg (841.5 m, Rennsteigwarte) as well as e.g. the mountain villages of Neustadt am Rennsteig, Masserberg and Neuhaus am Rennweg.

See also 
List of mountains and hills of Thuringia

References 

Mountains under 1000 metres
Mountains of Thuringia
Thuringian Forest
Sonneberg (district)